49 Aurigae is a single star located 680 light years away from the Sun in the northern constellation of Auriga. It is visible to the naked eye as a dim, white-hued star with an apparent visual magnitude of 5.26. The star is moving away from the Earth with a heliocentric radial velocity of +17 km/s, having come to within  some 5.5 million years ago. It is positioned near the ecliptic and thus is subject to lunar occultations.

This object is an A-type main-sequence star with a stellar classification of A0 Vnn, where the 'n' notation indicates "nebulous" lines due to rapid rotation. It is spinning with a projected rotational velocity of 149 km/s. This star has around 2.3 times the radius of the Sun and is radiating over three times the Sun's luminosity from its photosphere at an effective temperature of 8,794 K.

References

A-type main-sequence stars
Auriga (constellation)
Durchmusterung objects
Aurigae, 49
046553
031434
2398